Tona Scherchen, also Tona Scherchen-Hsiao (Simplified Chinese: 萧桐; born 12 March 1938), is one of the first composers who brought Chinese elements into European avant-garde art music.

Life
Tona Scherchen was born into a musical family in Neuchâtel. Her father was conductor Hermann Scherchen and her mother was composer Xiao Shuxian. She spent the first 12 years of her life in Europe, particularly in Switzerland. She arrived in China in 1950 with her mother and her older sister Féfé. In 1956, just a year before China fell into political chaos, she returned to Europe to be with her father in order to pursue further music education. Her teachers included György Ligeti and Hans Werner Henze.

After the 1960s, Scherchen had become an active composer, titles of her music were frequently seen in contemporary music programmes. Her works were published by prominent publishers, and several articles on her as a composer can be found, although after some appearances in 1980s, she seemingly ceased to catch attention beyond her French circle.

Music
Scherchen's music is an adaption of the avant-garde idioms of the European 1960s, '70s, synthesized with a language of her own. Many of her compositions bear Chinese titles, but the influence of Chinese arts and thoughts is more conceptual than literal. The only exception is Yi, a suite for one marimba with two players, in which she recalled folk tunes heard in her Chinese years. It is a moving piece, dedicated to her mother, whom Tona probably was not able to meet for three decades due to the political situation.

Several recordings of Tona's works have been commercially issued, but today only Lo for trombone and strings, and Shen for six percussionists, can be found on CD, despite all her music being available in print.

Selected works
Her publishers include Universal Edition, Boosey & Hawkes, Alfred Peschek and Amphion.

Orchestra
 Khouang (1966–1968)
 Vague T'ao, "Plusieurs silences" d'une grande vague déchainée (1974–1975)
 S.... (1975)
 Œil de chat (1st Cycle) (1976–1977)
 L'invitation au voyage for chamber orchestra (1979)

Concertante
 Tao for viola solo and orchestra (1971–1972)
 Lo for trombone solo and 12 stringed instruments (1978–1979)

Chamber music
 In for flute solo (1966)
 Sin for flute solo (oriental flute if possible) with percussion (1 player) (1967)
 Shen (神), ou, à propos des battements du cœur humain, New Ballet for percussion (1968)
 Tzoué, Trio (1970)
 Bien (Mutations) for 12 instrumentalists (1973)
 Lien (恋) for viola solo (1973)
 Tjao-Houen for chamber ensemble (1973)
 Yi (忆), 7 Brief Images for marimbaphone (2 players) (1973)
 Yun-yu (云雨; Clouds and Rain; Nuages et pluie) for violin or viola and vibraphone (1974)
 Ziguidor for woodwind quintet (1978)
 Escargots volants (Flying Snails) for clarinet solo (1979)
 Once Upon a Time for harp (1979)

Piano
 Radar (1983)

Vocal
 Tzi for 16 voices (SATB) a cappella, diapason and gong grave (1969–1970)
 Wai (外) for mezzo-soprano with percussion and string quartet (1967)

References

External links
 Kennedy, Michael, The Oxford Dictionary of Music (2006), 

1938 births
20th-century classical composers
Gaudeamus Composition Competition prize-winners
Living people
People from Neuchâtel
Swiss women composers
Swiss people of Chinese descent
Swiss people of German descent
20th-century Swiss composers